The March for Life is an annual anti-abortion demonstration held in Prague in late March, close to the International Day of the Unborn Child (25 March). The first march was held in 2001. The participants usually carry white crosses symbolizing the victims of abortion. The event is supported by the Latin and Eastern Catholic churches. The march is usually opened by a Mass celebrated by Dominik Duka, Cardinal-Archbishop of Prague. Politicians such as Pavel Bělobrádek (KDU-ČSL), Jitka Chalánková (TOP 09), Eva Richtrová (ČSSD) and Jaroslav Plachý (ODS) have attended the march in the past. The march leads to the Wenceslas Square and ends at the Saint Wenceslas statue.

See also
Abortion in the Czech Republic
March for Life and Family
March for Life (Washington, D.C.)
Walk for Life West Coast

References

External links

 

2001 establishments in the Czech Republic
Recurring events established in 2001
Catholic Church and abortion
Christianity in Prague
Anti-abortion movement
Protest marches
Prague